José Rui Tavares da Veiga (born 16 September 1982), commonly known as Zé Rui, is a Cape Verdean professional footballer who plays for Paivense as a left winger.

Honours
Vitória Setúbal
Taça de Portugal: 2004–05

CSKA Sofia
First Professional Football League (Bulgaria): 2007–08

External links

1982 births
Living people
People from Vila Franca de Xira
Portuguese footballers
Portuguese people of Cape Verdean descent
Citizens of Cape Verde through descent
Cape Verdean footballers
Association football wingers
Primeira Liga players
Liga Portugal 2 players
Segunda Divisão players
F.C. Alverca players
Vitória F.C. players
F.C. Penafiel players
C.D. Nacional players
Associação Naval 1º de Maio players
Académico de Viseu F.C. players
Lusitano FCV players
First Professional Football League (Bulgaria) players
PFC CSKA Sofia players
Liga I players
ACF Gloria Bistrița players
Cape Verde international footballers
Portuguese expatriate footballers
Cape Verdean expatriate footballers
Expatriate footballers in Bulgaria
Expatriate footballers in Romania
Portuguese expatriate sportspeople in Bulgaria
Portuguese expatriate sportspeople in Romania
Sportspeople from Lisbon District